Sisyrbe is a monotypic genus of North American spiders in the family Linyphiidae containing the single species, Sisyrbe rustica. It was first described by S. C. Bishop and C. R. Crosby in 1938, and has only been found in the United States.

See also
 List of Linyphiidae species (Q–Z)

References

Linyphiidae
Monotypic Araneomorphae genera
Spiders of the United States